The 2017 Audi Cup was the fifth edition of the Audi Cup, a two-day association football tournament that featured four teams and be played at the Allianz Arena in Munich, Germany. The competition featured the hosts and 2015 winners Bayern Munich, Spanish side Atlético Madrid, English side Liverpool, and Italian side Napoli.

The competition was won by Atlético Madrid, who defeated Liverpool in the final 5–4 on penalties after a 1–1 draw.

Participating teams
 Bayern Munich
 Atlético Madrid
 Liverpool
 Napoli

Competition format
The competition had the format of a regular knockout competition. The winners of each of the two matches on the first day competed against each other for the Audi Cup, while the two losing sides played in a third-place match. The trophy was contested over two days, with each day seeing two matches played back-to-back.

Matches
All times Central European Summer Time (UTC+2)

Semi-finals

Third place play-off

Final

Goalscorers
1 goal
  Keidi Bare (Atlético Madrid)
  José Callejón (Napoli)
  Roberto Firmino (Liverpool)
  Emanuele Giaccherini (Napoli)
  Kalidou Koulibaly (Napoli)
  Sadio Mané (Liverpool)
  Mohamed Salah (Liverpool)
  Daniel Sturridge (Liverpool)
  Fernando Torres (Atlético Madrid)
  Luciano Vietto (Atlético Madrid)

References

Audi Cup
Audi Cup